Paul Gerard Cahill (29 September 1955 – 6 June 2021) was an English association football defender who played during the 1970s and 1980s.

Cahill played in the Football League for Coventry City, Portsmouth, Aldershot, Tranmere Rovers and Stockport County. In 1978, he signed with the Southern California Lazers of the American Soccer League (where he earned all-league honors), before moving to the California Surf of the North American Soccer League in 1979. In 1981, he transferred to the San Jose Earthquakes, ending his career in 1982.

Cahill died on 6 June 2021, at the age of 65.

References

External links
 
 North American stats

1955 births
2021 deaths
Aldershot F.C. players
American Soccer League (1933–1983) players
California Surf players
Coventry City F.C. players
English footballers
English expatriate footballers
Expatriate soccer players in the United States
Golden Bay Earthquakes (MISL) players
English Football League players
Major Indoor Soccer League (1978–1992) players
North American Soccer League (1968–1984) indoor players
North American Soccer League (1968–1984) players
Portsmouth F.C. players
San Jose Earthquakes (1974–1988) players
Footballers from Liverpool
Stockport County F.C. players
Tranmere Rovers F.C. players
Southern California Lazers players
Association football defenders
English expatriate sportspeople in the United States